The Godrej family is an Indian Parsi family that manages and largely owns the Godrej Group of company- a conglomerate founded by Ardeshir Godrej and his brother Pirojsha Burjorji Godrej in 1897. It spans sectors as diverse as real estate, consumer products, industrial engineering, appliances, furniture, security and agricultural products. Headed by Adi Godrej alongside his brother, Nadir Godrej, and cousin, Jamshyd Godrej, the family is one of the richest in India; with an estimated net worth of  billion as of 2014.

History

The family's presence in business began in Bombay in 1897, when Ardeshir Godrej, after reading a newspaper article about rising citywide crime rates, began developing and selling locks, with the assistance of his brother Pirojsha. Ardeshir Godrej died childless; Pirojsha Godrej's sons Burjor, Sohrab, and Naval succeeded in the second generation. Today, grandsons Adi, Nadir, and Jamshyd manage the group. The initial venture, Godrej Brothers, has since diversified across sectors and evolved into multiple companies under the umbrella of the Godrej Group, including Godrej Industries, Godrej Agrovet, Godrej Consumer Products, Godrej Properties, Godrej Interio, and the holding company Godrej & Boyce.

Estate in Mumbai

Among the family's most valuable assets is a 3,500-acre estate in Vikhroli, Mumbai, the value of which is estimated at $12 billion if developed; in 2011, the family announced plans to develop three million square feet by 2017, through an internal joint venture composed of Godrej Industries and Godrej Properties. For decades, the family has preserved some 1,750 acres of mangrove swamps within the estate, leading to the 2012 inclusion of Adi Godrej and Jamshyd Godrej in Forbes magazine's list of the richest green billionaires. On 18 June 2014, Godrej family bought the iconic bungalow of Homi J. Bhabha, Mehrangir, for Rs. 372 Cr through an auction initiated by the National Center for the Performing Arts in Mumbai.

Members
Ardeshir Godrej, Cofounder of Godrej Brothers
Pirojsha Burjorji Godrej, cofounder of Godrej Brothers
Burjor Godrej
Sohrab Pirojsha Godrej, chairman of the Group
Naval Godrej
Adi Godrej, chairman of the Godrej Group
Parmeshwar Godrej, socialite and AIDS activist
Pirojsha Adi Godrej, Managing Director & CEO of Godrej Properties Limited
Nadir Godrej, managing director of Godrej Industries and chairman of Godrej Agrovet
Jamshyd Godrej, chairman of Godrej & Boyce
Nyrika Holkar, executive director of Godrej & Boyce
Smita V. Crishna, stock holder of Godrej Group

Charities
The family controls the Pirojsha Godrej Foundation, Soonabai Pirojsha Godrej Foundation and Godrej Memorial Trust.

Bibliography

External links
Adi Godrej : An Overview

References

Parsi people from Mumbai
Business families of India
Godrej Group
Godrej family